The Lentariaceae are a family of fungi belonging in what is classically known as the Gomphales order, or cladistically as the gomphoid-phalloid clade. First described by Swiss mycologist Walter Jülich in 1981, the family has 3 genera and 23 species.

References

External links

Gomphales
Basidiomycota families
Taxa named by Walter Jülich
Fungi described in 1981